Bureau of Manpower Employment and Training is government department that is responsible for the training and employment of Bangladeshi overseas and is located in Dhaka, Bangladesh.

History
Bureau of Manpower Employment and Training was established in 1976 under the Ministry of Manpower Development and Social Welfare as a department. They provide Bangladeshi workers with Smart cards, Biometric registration, and immigration clearance. The Bureau explores the opportunities for Bangladeshi labor force outside the country. It operates the Institute of Marine Technology and runs it under its supervision among other technical educational centres.

References

Government agencies of Bangladesh
1976 establishments in Bangladesh
Organisations based in Dhaka
Public employment service
Bangladeshi diaspora
Training organizations